Penny is the given name of:

 Penny Cook (born 1957-2018), Australian actress, writer and presenter
 Penny Coomes (born 1989), English ice dancer
 Penny Fuller (born 1940), American actress
 Penny Grice-Whittaker (born 1964), British golfer
 Penny Hamilton (born 1948), American pilot
 Penny Hammel (born 1962), American golfer
 Penny Hart (born 1996), American football player
 Penny Herscher, American executive
 Penny Johnson Jerald (born 1961), American actress
 Penny Lancaster (born 1971), English model and photographer, wife of Rod Stewart
 Penny LaRocque (born c. 1943), Canadian retired curler
 Penny Marshall (1943–2018), American actress and director, best known for playing a character in Laverne & Shirley
 Penny McCoy (born 1949), American alpine skier
 Penny Priddy (born 1944), Canadian politician
 Penny Pritzker (born 1959), American businesswoman, civic leader and philanthropist
 Penny Pulz (born 1953), Australian golfer
 Penny Tai (born 1978), Malaysian-Chinese singer
 Penny Vincenzi (1939-2018), British novelist
 Penny Wolin (born 1953),  American portrait photographer and visual anthropologist
 Penny Woolcock (born 1950), British filmmaker, opera director and screenwriter

Penny as a nickname
Those with the first name Penelope who commonly go by Penny include:
 Penelope Heyns (born 1974), South African retired swimmer
 Penny Jamieson (born 1942), Bishop of Dunedin in the Anglican Church of New Zealand (1989-2004)
 Penny Jordan (1946–2011), English best-selling and prolific writer 
 Penny Mordaunt (born 1973), British Member of Parliament
 Penny Pitou (born 1938), American retired alpine skier
 Penny Singleton (1908–2003), American film actress
 Penny Smith (born 1958), English television presenter and newsreader
 Penny Taylor (born 1981), Australian basketball player
 Penny Tranter (born 1961), Scottish meteorologist
 Penny Valentine (1943–2003), British music journalist
 Penny Wong (born 1968), Australian Labor Party senator
 Penny Wright (born 1961), Australian Greens senator

Others using this as a nickname include:
 Penny Chenery (1922–2017), American racehorse owner and breeder
 Penny Thompson (1917–1975), American aviator
 Penny Hardaway (born 1971), American retired National Basketball Association player

Fictional characters
 The title character of Penny (comic strip)
 Penny, a character from The Big Bang Theory
 Penny, a character from The Rescuers
 Penny, a character from Bolt
 Penny, a character from Dr. Horrible's Sing-Along Blog
 Penny, the niece of the titular character in the 1980s animated series Inspector Gadget
 Penny, a character from Pee-wee's Playhouse
 Penny, a character from The Mighty B!
 Penny, the female counterpart to Tux the Penguin in Linux computer games
 Penny, a character from Pokémon Scarlet and Violet
 Penny Crygor, a character from the WarioWare series
 Penny Fitzgerald, a character from the Cartoon Network animated series The Amazing World of Gumball
 Penny Halliwell, a character from The WB series Charmed
 Penny Hartz, a character from the sitcom Happy Endings
 Penny Haywood, a character from the mobile game Harry Potter: Hogwarts Mystery
 Penny Lane, a character from the 2000 film Almost Famous
 Penny Ling, a character from Littlest Pet Shop
 Penny Morris,a character from the Welsh children's animated television series Fireman Sam
 Penny Peterson, a character in the 2014 film Mr. Peabody & Sherman
 Penny Pingleton, a character in the 1988 film Hairspray and subsequent adaptations
 Penny Pingwing, a character from Pingwings.
 Penny Polendina, a character from the 2013 anime RWBY
 Penny the Pony Fairy, from the Rainbow Magic book franchise
 Penny Proud, the protagonist of the animated television series The Proud Family and its sequel series The Proud Family: Louder and Prouder
 Penny Robinson, a character from Lost in Space
 Penny Rourke, a character from the New Zealand soap opera Shortland Street
 Penny Sanchez, a supporting character in the animated television series ChalkZone
 Penny Scavo, in the television series Desperate Housewives
 Penny Tompkins, a character from the animated television comedy The Critic
 Penny Valentine, a character from Holby City
 Penny Widmore, a character from the ABC television drama Lost
 Penny Baker Williams, a character in the television sitcom Step by Step

English feminine given names
English-language feminine given names
Feminine given names